Micraspis frenata, common name Striped Ladybird, is a ladybird species endemic to Tasmania and the mainland eastern states of Australia.

References

External links
 images of M. frenata larva at http://www.ozanimals.com
 images of M. frenata at http://www.brisbaneinsects.com

Coccinellidae
Beetles described in 1842